Andy Harrington may refer to:
Andy Harrington (pitcher) (1888–1938), professional baseball pitcher
Andy Harrington (pinch hitter) (1903–1979), American Major League Baseball player